Nastoceras colluellum is a moth in the family Autostichidae. It was described by Pierre Chrétien in 1922. It is found in North Africa.

References

Moths described in 1922
Symmocinae